The Maple Leaf Farm Potato House is a historic agricultural storage building located on the property of Western Fields at Hebron, Wicomico County, Maryland.  It was originally located on the north side of U.S. Route 50, southeast of the intersection with White Lowe Road, and moved to its present site within Western Fields in July 1997.  It is a common bond brick structure measuring 40 feet by 24 feet, built between 1920 and 1928, and used for the storage of sweet potatoes.

It was listed on the National Register of Historic Places in 1998.

References

External links
, including photo from 1997, at Maryland Historical Trust

Agricultural buildings and structures on the National Register of Historic Places in Maryland
Buildings and structures in Wicomico County, Maryland
Buildings and structures completed in 1920
Agricultural buildings and structures on the National Register of Historic Places
Potato houses in the United States
Agricultural buildings and structures in Maryland
National Register of Historic Places in Wicomico County, Maryland
Sweet potatoes